Kenneth William Mayes (8 October 1910 – 21 February 1975) was an English footballer who played as an inside left or outside left for Southend United and Fulham in the Football League. He also played for Barking Town, Brentwood & Warley and Colchester United.

Personal life
Mayes played alongside his brother, Jack, at Chelmsford City.

References

1910 births
1975 deaths
People from Wickford
English footballers
Barking F.C. players
Brentwood Town F.C. players
Southend United F.C. players
Fulham F.C. players
Colchester Town F.C. players
Colchester United F.C. players
English Football League players
Chelmsford City F.C. players
Association football forwards